Dąbrowski (Panna, Virgo Violata) is a Polish coat of arms. It was used by several szlachta families.

History

Blazon

Gules a woman habited argent shod, crined and crowned or, holding in each hand and fessewise to her mouth an ancient horn also or.  Crest: issuant out of a crest coronet or a woman as in the arms holding in each hand an ancient horn palewise or the bell ends in base.  Mantled gules doubled argent.

Notable bearers

Notable bearers of this coat of arms include:

 Jan Henryk Dąbrowski

Gallery

See also
 Polish heraldry
 Heraldic family
 List of Polish nobility coats of arms

Bibliography 
 Adam Boniecki, "Herbarz Polski" (Warszawa, POLSKA: Gebethner i Wolff w Warszawie, 1901), Volume IV, page 124.

External links
 https://web.archive.org/web/20160304070613/http://www.wawrzak.org/kosinski/monografie/dabrowski.htm

Polish coats of arms
Coats of arms with crowns
Coats of arms with horns (instrument)
Family coats of arms